The Austrian Ladies Open was a professional golf tournament on the Ladies European Tour that is held in Austria. It was first played in 1994 and last played in 2012.

Winners

External links

Ladies European Tour

Former Ladies European Tour events
Golf tournaments in Austria